The All Your Fault Tour was the first headlining concert tour by American singer-songwriter Bebe Rexha in support of her second EP, All Your Fault: Pt. 1 (2017). The tour was officially announced on January 24, 2017. The tour began on March 1, 2017 in Dallas, and the first leg concluded on March 31, 2017 in Brooklyn, finishing with a total of twenty-one shows. The first leg of the tour was  supported by Daniel Skye. Rexha later announced the second leg of the tour, consisting of one Asian tour date in Dubai. The third leg of the tour began on May 1, 2017 in Antwerp, and concluded on May 18, 2017 in London.

Background
On January 24, 2017, Rexha announced the tour through social media. Rexha also disclosed that a second tour leg with all international dates is to be announced in a few days. “I’m going to as many countries as possible for my #Rexhars,” she wrote on Twitter. On January 27, 2017 it was announced that the tour's Toronto venue would be moved from Mod Club to Phoenix Concert Theatre to accommodate for more people.

Supporting acts
Daniel Skye (North America)
Spencer Ludwig (North America and Europe)
Not3s (Europe)

Set list
The following songs were performed on all dates, G-Eazy joined her for Me, Myself & I and F.F.F. in Santa Ana. The Monster was also performed on a few North American dates.
 "Bad Bitch"
 "Gateway Drug"
 "Me, Myself & I"
 "Atmosphere"
 "Small Doses"
 "In the Name of Love"
 "Take Me Home"
 "I'm Gonna Show You Crazy"
 "I Can't Stop Drinking About You"
 "F.F.F."
 "Hey Mama"
 "No Broken Hearts"
 "I Got You"

Tour dates

Cancelled shows

References

External links
Bebe Rexha Official Website

2017 concert tours
Bebe Rexha